The Church of St Mapley, Llanvapley, Monmouthshire is a parish church with its origins in the 15th century. Dedicated to St Mable, variants of the dedication include St Mapley, St Mabli and St Mafli. The church is a Grade II* listed building.

History

The church dates from the 15th century, and was restored in 1861 and 1950. The chancel and tower arches may be earlier, from the 13th or 14th centuries. The Monmouthshire antiquarian Joseph Bradney recorded that two of the bells dated from 1626.

Architecture and description
The church is built of Old Red Sandstone and the style is Early English. The tower has a corbelled parapet.

Notes

References
 

Grade II* listed churches in Monmouthshire
History of Monmouthshire
Church in Wales church buildings
15th-century church buildings in Wales